The Far North Coast Baseball Association (FNCBA) is the organising body for baseball on the Far North Coast of New South Wales.

History
In 1937, Laurie Thew, an aspiring right-handed pitcher from Sydney moved to Lismore and began efforts to establish baseball in the city. On 11 May 1937 a public notice was published in The Northern Star inviting interest in the formation of a 'Baseball Club', with the initial meeting taking place on Thursday 13 May 1937. Soon there were enough players for two teams and within weeks challenges were issued and representative games against Queensland based teams were being held. The first representative baseball game ever held in Lismore took place on Saturday 31 July 1937, Queensland vs Lismore, with the visitors winning 7-1 on the back of some brilliant pitching. The advent of World War II led to a hiatus and it was not until 1947 when Thew again proved the catalyst - calling a meeting to re-establish the league. Thew is now recognised as the “Father of Baseball” on the Far North Coast.

Initially the FNCBA played on cricket grounds during the winter and as the league grew this caused pressure on the city to find a dedicated space for the sport. Since 1965 FNCBA has used dedicated fields at the Albert Park sporting complex in Lismore, with the main diamond now known as Baxter Field.

From 1952, the FNCBA was affiliated with Baseball Queensland, but in August 2018 they moved to the NSW Country Baseball Association, under the banner of Baseball NSW.

In 2015, for the first time in the 78-year history of the FNCBA, an all-women's team competed - the Ballina Sharkettes.

Currently there are teams from clubs based in Ballina, Casino and several clubs (Easts, Marist Brothers, Norths and Workers) from Lismore. In the past there have also been clubs from Alstonville and Kyogle.

The Association has produced numerous Australian (men's and women's) representatives including Barry Wappett*, Barry Pratt, Ray, Mark and  Mat Buckley*, Harold Crozier, Matt Gahan, Peter Gahan, Matt Gates, Adrian Meagher*, Michael Nind*, Karina Connors and James Linger.  Those marked with an asterisk (*) represented Australia at the Olympics. The area remains one of the strongest centres for Baseball in Australia.

Clubs

Major League Champions
2020 Workers
2019: Norths
2018:	Easts
2017:	Workers
2016:	Easts
2015:	Easts
2014:	Norths
2013:	Marists
2012:	Easts
2011:	Easts
2010:	Easts
2009:	Norths
2008:	Norths
2007:	Workers
2006:	Easts
2005:	Easts
2004:	Workers
2003:	Marists
2002:	Marists
2001:	Workers
2000:	Marists
1999:	Workers
1998:	Marists
1997:	Marists
1996:	Workers
1995:	Marists
1994:	Marists
1993:	Norths
1992:	Norths
1991:	Marists
1990:	
1989	Workers
1988:	Marists
1987:	Workers
1986:	Marists
1985:	Workers
1984:	Marists
1983:	Workers
1982:	Marists
1981:	Easts
1980:	Marists
1979:	Marists
1978:	Marists
1977:	Marists
1976:	Marists
1975:	Marists
1974:	Marists
1973:	
1972:	
1971/72:
1971:	Marists
1970/71: Marists
1970:	Marists
1969:	
1968:	
1967:	
1966:	Workers
1965:	Workers
1964:	Marists
1963:	
1962:	Marists
1961:	
1960:	
1959:	
1958:	Marists
1957:	Marists
1956:	Marists
1955:	Marists
1954:	Marists
1953:	Marists
1952:	A G Robertsons (AGRs)
1951:	AGRs
1950:	Souths
1949: Souths
1948:	Cubs
1947:	
1946: No competition.
1945: No competition.	
1944: No competition.	
1943: No competition.
1942: No competition.
1941: 
1940: Saxons
1939:	Cubs
1938: Giants
1937:

Huckleberry Medal (Major League MVP)
Beginning 1960, at the end of every season, the "Huckleberry Medal" has been awarded to the player deemed MVP in the FNCBA "Major League" competition. Past winners have been:

In addition to the list below, Peter Gahan (Marist Brothers) won the medal five-times in the 1970s-1980s.
2019: Robbie Pruess (East Redbirds)
2018: Robbie Pruess (East Redbirds)
2017: Will Riley (Redbirds)
2016: Robbie Pruess (East Redbirds)
2015: Michael Munro (Easts Redbirds)
2014: James Linger (Norths)
2013:
2012: Troy Pruess (Workers)
2011: Mick McClelland (Workers)
2010: Robbie Pruess (Redbirds)
2009: Paul Simes (Norths)
2008: Dallas Knapp (Workers)
2007: James Linger (Norths)
2006: Troy Pruess (Workers)
2005: Troy Pruess (Workers)
2004: Dallas Knapp (Workers)
2003: Matt Gahan (Marist Brothers)
2002: Paul Simes (Norths)
2001: Dallas Knapp (Workers)
2000: Chris Neven (Marist Brothers)
1999: Wayne Devlin (Workers)
1998: Matt Gahan (Marist Brothers)
1997: David Youngberry (Marist Brothers)
1996: David Youngberry (Marist Brothers)
1995: David Youngberry (Marist Brothers)
1994: Mark Buckley (Marist Brothers)
1993: Mark Buckley (Marist Brothers)
1992: Peter Buttrum (Norths)
1991: Alan Worgan (Workers)
1990:
1989:
1988:
1987:
1986:
1985:
1984: Alan Worgan (Workers)
1983: Stephen Devlin (Workers)
1982: Adrian Meagher (Workers)
1981:
1980:
1979:
1978:
1977: Adrian Meagher (Workers)
1976: Bob McClelland (Workers)
1975: Michael Gahan Jnr (Marist Brothers)
1974:
1973:
1972:
1971: Michael Gahan Jnr (Marist Brothers)
1970:
1969: Maurice Gahan (Marist Brothers)
1968:
1967:
1966:
1965:
1964:
1963:
1962:
1961:
1960: Reg Baxter (Norths)

See also

Australian Baseball Federation
New South Wales Major League
New South Wales Patriots

References

External links
 
 FNCBA on Facebook

Sources

Baseball in New South Wales
New
Baseball leagues in Australia
1937 establishments in Australia
Sports organizations established in 1937
Northern Rivers